Taipei City Dragons FC, also known as TC Dragons, is a football club from Tainan, Taiwan. It is one of the main association football clubs in Taiwan. 2,000 capacity Tainan Football Field is their home stadium.

External links

 Stadium picture
 Club logo

Football clubs in Taiwan